The 2012 Horizon Laser Vision Center Classic was held from September 28 to October 1 at the Tartan Curling Club in Regina, Saskatchewan as part of the 2012–13 World Curling Tour. The event was held in a triple-knockout format, and the purse for the event was CAD$16,000.

Teams
Teams are announced as follows.

One women's team entered the event (Michelle Englot). The rest are men's teams.

Knockout results
The draw is listed as follows:

A event

B event

C event

Playoffs

References

External links

2012 in curling